"A Dream's a Dream" is a song by British R&B band Soul II Soul, released in 1990 as the second single from their second album, Vol. II: 1990 – A New Decade (1990). It features American-born British singer Victoria Wilson-James and received favorable reviews from music critics. The single was successful all over Europe, reaching number-one in Greece and the top 10 in Finland, Italy, the Netherlands, Norway and the UK. Additionally, it was a top 20 hit in Austria, Belgium, Germany, Ireland, Sweden and Switzerland. Outside Europe, it peaked at number three on the Billboard Dance Club Songs chart in the US, number eight in New Zealand and number 27 in Australia.

Critical reception
Alex Henderson from AllMusic described the song as "haunting". Bill Coleman from Billboard named it one of the "special moments" from Vol. II: 1990 – A New Decade. He called it a "seductive, sleaze-speed club track with house overtones [that] is (gratefully) less derivative of previous efforts. Vocals by Victoria Wilson-James excite." Ernest Hardy from Cashbox complimented the "operatic touch" of the song. Ian Gittins from Melody Maker wrote, "It's no "Back to Life", never so entrancing or alluring, but still there's that loping, dance-compulsory beat which lets them get away with anything before Jazzie muzzles in to growl his hopeful, dreamy creed." David Giles from Music Week stated, "All the trademarks are there — shuffling rhythm, sweeping strings and wailing female vocals — and these should ensure another substantial hit for Jazzie B and his crew." 

A reviewer from The Network Forty described it as "Jazzy B's soul-jazz-African-operatic single". Paolo Hewitt from NME remarked Wilson-James' "operatic technique". Davydd Chong from Record Mirror felt that only one track from the album, "A Dream's a Dream", "warded off the bite of the critic, with a garland of garlic and a majestic arrangement." Tom Doyle from Smash Hits complimented the singer's voice as "marvellous". Steven Daly from Spin concluded that it "won't dictate this summer's tempo the way "Movin'" did last year, but this gentle house sway will nonetheless build a little birdhouse in your soul. (In case you were concerned, yes, Jazzie manages to stop by for his usual lecture.)"

Music video
A music video was produced to promote the single. It was later published on Soul II Soul's official YouTube channel in November 2009. It had generated more than 345,000 views as of December 2022.

Track listing
 12" single, US (1990)
"A Dream's a Dream" (A Night at the Opera Mix) – 5:45
"A Dream's a Dream" (Club Dub) – 4:25
"Courtney Blows" – 4:32                

 CD single, UK (1990)
"A Dream's a Dream" – 4:13
"A Dream's a Dream" (A Night at the Opera Mix) – 5:49
"A Dream's a Dream" (Club Dub) – 4:28
"Courtney Blows" – 4:33                  

 CD single, Europe (1990)
"A Dream's a Dream" – 4:13
"A Dream's a Dream" (A Night at the Opera Mix) – 5:49
"A Dream's a Dream" (Club Dub) – 4:28
"Courtney Blows" – 4:33

Charts

Weekly charts

Year-end charts

References

1990 songs
1990 singles
New jack swing songs
Number-one singles in Greece
Soul II Soul songs
Songs written by Jazzie B
Songs written by Simon Law
Song recordings produced by Nellee Hooper
Virgin Records singles